is a Japanese politician of the Liberal Democratic Party who serves as a member of the House of Councillors of Japan.

Career
Takemi used to be a professor of Tokai University whose main subject is international politics. He was first elected to a member of the House of Councillors on 23 July 1995. He served until July 2007, and was Vice Minister of Ministry of Health, Labour and Welfare of the Abe Cabinet from September 2006 until August 2007. Takemi narrowly lost his seat in 2007. In 2012, he returned to the House of Councillors, and he won reelection in 2013 and 2019.

In 2006, United Nations Secretary-General Kofi Annan appointed Takemi to a High-level Panel on United Nations Systemwide Coherence, which was set up to explore how the United Nations system could work more coherently and effectively across the world in the areas of development, humanitarian assistance and the environment.

In March 2016, Takemi was appointed by United Nations Secretary-General Ban Ki-moon to the High-Level Commission on Health Employment and Economic Growth, which was co-chaired by presidents François Hollande of France and Jacob Zuma of South Africa.

In June 2019, World Health Organization (WHO) Director General Tedros Adhanom Ghebreyesus appointed Takemi as WHO Goodwill Ambassador for Universal Health Coverage. Since 2022, he has been a member of the Commission for Universal Health convened by Chatham House and co-chaired by Helen Clark and Jakaya Kikwete.

Personal life
His father was Taro Takemi, president of the Japan Medical Association.

References

External links
Official site (in Japanese)

Living people
1951 births
People from Tokyo
Japanese political scientists
Liberal Democratic Party (Japan) politicians
Members of the House of Councillors (Japan)
Keio University alumni
Academic staff of Tokai University